The Flame That Will Not Die (Italian: Fiamma che non si spegne) is a 1949 Italian war drama film directed by Vittorio Cottafavi and starring Gino Cervi, María Denis and Leonardo Cortese. It is based on the story of Salvo D'Acquisto, a Carabinieri officer who died to save others being executed by the Germans during the Second World War.

It was made at Cinecittà Studios. The film's sets were designed by Ottavio Scotti.

Cast
 Gino Cervi as Luigi Manfredi  
 María Denis as Maria 
 Leonardo Cortese as Giuseppe Manfredi  
 Luigi Tosi as Giovanni  
 Carlo Campanini as Il zio di Maria  
 Danielle Benson as Caterina  
 Diana Benucci
 Siro Angeli 
 Lorena Berg 
 Nando Bruno 
 Tino Buazzelli 
 Vittorio Cottafavi 
 Maurizio Di Nardo 
 Giovanni Lovatelli 
 Fulvia Mammi as Norina  
 Carlo Mariotti 
 Arnaldo Mochetti 
 Diego Muni 
 Dina Romano 
 Gian Paolo Rosmino 
 Gustavo Serena 
 Barbara Vassarotti 
 Gaio Visconti

References

Bibliography 
 Guido Bonsaver & Robert Gordon. Culture, Censorship and the State in Twentieth-century Italy. European Humanities Research Centre, 2005.

External links 
 

1940s war drama films
Italian war drama films
1949 films
1940s Italian-language films
Films directed by Vittorio Cottafavi
Italian black-and-white films
1949 drama films
Films scored by Alessandro Cicognini
Italian World War II films
World War II films based on actual events
1940s Italian films